Mateja Zver (born 15 March 1988) is a Slovenian footballer who plays as a midfielder for SKN St. Pölten in the ÖFB-Frauenliga. She also played for Pomurje in the Slovenian Women's League and for Þór/KA in Iceland's Úrvalsdeild. She was the top scorer of the 2006–07 Slovenian League with 61 goals, which stood as a record for 15 years before being surpassed by Ana Milović in 2022.

Zver is a member of the Slovenian national team, and has served as the team's captain.

References

External links
 Profile at Football Association of Slovenia 
 
 Profile at Austrian Football Association 

1988 births
Living people
Slovenian women's footballers
Women's association football midfielders
Slovenia women's international footballers
ŽNK Mura players
Mateja Zver
FSK St. Pölten-Spratzern players
ÖFB-Frauenliga players
Slovenian expatriate footballers
Expatriate women's footballers in Iceland
Slovenian expatriate sportspeople in Iceland
Expatriate women's footballers in Austria
Slovenian expatriate sportspeople in Austria